Everyday I Said a Prayer for Kathy and Made a One Inch Square is the fourth full-length album by Wheat. It was released in the spring of 2007.

Track listing
All songs written by Wheat (Brendan Harney and Scott Levesque).

Closeness – 5:08
Little White Dove – 3:37
Move = Move – 4:21
I Had Angels Watching Over Me – 3:05
Init .005 (Formerly, a Case of ...) – 4:27
Saint in Law – 2:41
What You Got – 3:22
To, as in Addressing the Grave – 3:16
Round in the Corners – 3:47
An Exhausted Fixer – 4:39
Courting Ed Templeton – 4:36

Production notes
Recorded at Electric Ali (Fairhaven, Mass.); additional recording by Wheat at home. Mixed by Rick Lescault. Mastered by Jeff Lipton at Peerless Mastering (Boston, Mass.); assistant mastering engineer: Jessica Thompson.

References

2007 albums
Wheat (band) albums